Harold W. Cohn (September 25, 1913 – March 14, 1974) was an American politician who served in the New York State Assembly from 1959 to 1968.

He died of cancer on March 14, 1974, in Brooklyn, New York City, New York at age 60.

References

1913 births
1974 deaths
Democratic Party members of the New York State Assembly
20th-century American politicians